WEWC (1160 AM) is a radio station broadcasting a Spanish tropical music format. Licensed to Callahan, Florida, United States, the station serves the Jacksonville area. The station is currently owned by Norsan Consulting and Management, Inc. and features programming from CNN Radio. WEWC simulcast on WVOJ until that station went silent on January 11, 2017.

History
The station went on the air as WELX on July 11, 1988. On November 8, 2001, it changed its call sign to WEWC.

References

External links
Latina 92.1 Facebook
Norsan Media Radio Stations

EWC
Radio stations established in 1988
1988 establishments in Florida